The George Paton Gallery, formerly the Ewing and George Paton Gallery, was founded in Melbourne in the mid 1970s at the University of Melbourne Student Union.

History and exhibitions 
The George Paton Gallery was the central hub for experimental art in Australia in the 1970s and early 1980s. As well as presenting diverse and challenging exhibitions, it fostered a strong community of creative discourse through film screenings, poetry readings, performance events and hosting meetings by marginalised groups of artists and activists. Early influential exhibitions that cement the radical nature of the gallery's first decade include Janine Burke's "Australian women artists: One hundred years, 1840–1940" presented in 1975, and "The Letter Show", presented in  1974, curated by founding Directors Kiffy Rubbo and Meredith Rogers. Later Directors developed their reputations as influential curators in the gallery, including  Judy Annear (1980–1982), who went on to be the founding Director of Artspace in Sydney and curator of Australian Perspecta, 1995; Denise Robinson (1982–1986), who became Director of the Australian Centre for Photography; and Juliana Engberg (1986–1989), who has been Director of the Australian Centre for Contemporary Art, Melbourne, artistic director of the Biennale of Sydney 2014: You Imagine What You Desire, and program director for European Capital of Culture Aarhus 2017 in Denmark. The George Paton Gallery continues as a contemporary art gallery with a focus on students, and supporting their emerging practices and research.

Artists 
New and hybrid media has been a feature of the gallery's exhibition program. The archive of artists who have shown work at George Paton Gallery includes many notable Australian artists. These prominent artists include: Elizabeth Gower, Jill Orr, Vivienne Shark Le Witt, Bonita Ely, Natasha Johns-Messenger, Micky Allan, Maria Kozic, Pat Brassington, Aleks Danko, Peter Burgess, Jenny Watson and many more.

Exhibitions 

 1980 Women At Work - A week of women's performance. In June 1980 a series of performances, seminars, slide shows, discussions and video screenings was held at Union House, University of Melbourne, including in outdoor and indoor public spaces, the  Union theatre spaces and in the George Paton Gallery. Artists included Jill Orr, Anne Marsh, Cath Cherry,  Bonita Ely, Ann Fogarty, Joan Grounds, Jan Hunter, Jane Kent, Vineta Lagzdina, Jackie Lawes, Anna Paci, Liz Paterson and the Wimmins Circus.

Feminist legacy 
Founding Directors Kiffy Rubbo and Meredith Rogers played a leading role in developing George Paton Gallery as a feminist art space. The legacy of the Women's Art Movement and its associated activities at the George Paton Gallery is outlined by Janine Burke as a revolution of art, politics, experimentation and activism. The environment at the gallery fostered the emergence of key feminist organisations and publications including the Women's Art Register, Lip magazine, Art Almanac and the Women's Art Forum.

References 

Art museums and galleries in Melbourne
1970s establishments in Australia